Deadlights is a three-song EP by the Norwegian black metal band Gehenna. This extended play was released upon their signing to Moonfog Productions.  Gehenna released this as a preview of the change in sound of the band.

The first track, "Deadlights", was a song on their 1998 record, Adimiron Black. "In Mother's Tomb", the second track, was an outtake from Adimiron Black. The third track is the original version of "Master Satan".

Track listing
"Deadlights" – 5:30
"In Mother's Tomb" – 6:13
"Master Satan" – 4:06

Credits
Sanrabb – lead guitar, vocals
Dolgar – rhythm guitar, vocals
E.N. Death – bass
Damien – keyboards
Blod – drums

Gehenna (band) albums
1996 EPs